Massimo Cioffi (Telese Terme, 24 May 1997) is an Italian rugby union player.
His usual position is as a Wing and he currently plays for Valorugby Emilia in Top10.

Under contract with Rovigo Delta, for 2019–20 Pro14 season, he named as Additional Player for Zebre in Pro 14. He played with Valorugby Emilia in Top10 in 2021−2022 season.

In 2017 Cioffi was named in the Italy Under 20 squad  and from 2018 he is part of the Italy Sevens squad also to participate at the Qualifying Tournament for the 2020 Summer Olympics.
In 2018, he was also named in the Emerging Italy squad for the World Rugby Nations Cup.

References

External links 
It's Rugby France Profile
ESPN Profile

1997 births
Italian rugby union players
Living people
Valorugby Emilia players
Rugby union wings